Streptomyces mayteni is a bacterium species from the genus of Streptomyces which has been isolated from roots from the plant Maytenus austroyunnanensis.

See also 
 List of Streptomyces species

References

Further reading 
 
 

mayteni
Bacteria described in 2009